United Nations Security Council resolution 618, adopted unanimously on 29 July 1988, after recalling Resolution 579 (1985) on hostage-taking, the Council condemned the abduction of Lieutenant-Colonel William R. Higgins and demanded his immediate release. It also urged Member States to use their influence to promote the implementation of the current resolution.

The resolution was not implemented, and Higgins was later murdered by his captors.

See also 
 Israeli–Lebanese conflict
 Lebanese Civil War
 List of United Nations Security Council Resolutions 601 to 700 (1987–1991)
 South Lebanon conflict (1985–2000)

References
Text of the Resolution at undocs.org

External links
 

 0618
Israeli–Lebanese conflict
1988 in Lebanon
 0618
 0618
Hostage taking
July 1988 events